Dr. Michael Earl Schlesinger (February 23, 1943 - April 11, 2018) was a Professor of Atmospheric Sciences and director of the Climate Research Group at the University of Illinois at Urbana-Champaign. He received his Ph.D. (meteorology) in 1976 from the University of California, Los Angeles.
 
Michael Schlesinger was an expert in the modeling, simulation and analysis of climate and climate change, with interests in simulating and understanding the climates of the geologic past and possible future climates resulting from increased concentrations of greenhouse gases and human-made aerosols.

He was instrumental in developing a range of simple and complex climate models, which have been used by the Intergovernmental Panel on Climate Change and the Energy Modeling Forum. His research focused on: (1) simulating and understanding the effects on climate of a human-induced melting of the Greenland ice sheet; (2) simulating and understanding the coupled climate-chemistry system, including the influences of the Sun - both irradiance and energetic electron precipitation - and volcanoes; (3) understanding and reducing the uncertainty in the estimation of climate sensitivity and climate feedbacks; and (4) performing integrative assessment of climate change, including further development of the robust adaptive decision strategy for mitigating and adapting to human-induced climate change.

He is known for his work on oscillations in the global climate system, on estimating the climate sensitivity, and on seasonal climate change.

He edited four books, most recently Human-induced climate change: An interdisciplinary assessment. He regularly appeared in the media.

References

External links
Home page
Google Scholar

American climatologists
Intergovernmental Panel on Climate Change lead authors
University of Illinois Urbana-Champaign faculty
University of California, Los Angeles alumni
1943 births
2018 deaths